Das Leben ist Saad ("Life is Saad") is the first solo album by German rapper Baba Saad. It was released 16 June 2006 via ersguterjunge. The album sold over 30,000 records.

Track list
 Intro – 1:10
 Grün - Weiß WB  (Green - White WB) – 3:15
 Glaub an dich  (Believe in yourself) (feat. Chakuza) – 3:03
 Womit hab ich das verdient  (How did I deserve this?) – 3:36
 Gefangen  (Trapped) (feat. Azad) – 3:55
 S Doppel A  (S double A) – 3:11
 Was mir fehlt  (What I'm missing) – 3:18
 Die Letzten werden die Ersten sein  (The last ones will be the first ones) (feat. Eko Fresh) – 3:38
 Komm endlich zurück  (Come back) (feat. Bahar) – 3:33
 Prost auf dich  (Cheers to you) (feat. Bushido) – 3:31
 !! Wieso !!  (!!Why!!) (feat. Bizzy Montana) – 2:45
 Das Leben ist Saad (Life is Saad) – 3:17
 Ich halt die Stellung (I keep the position) – 3:53
 Verschwunden  (Disappeared) (feat. D-Bo) – 3:43
 Unterschätzt  (Underestimated) – 3:02
 Carlo, Cokxxx, Nutten Flavor  (Carlo, Coke, Hoes Flavor) (feat. Bushido) – 2:57
 Um uns herum  (Around us) (feat. JokA) – 4:04
 Outro – 2:05

2006 albums
Baba Saad albums